Jordiyali is small but well developed village of Vav taluka of Banaskantha district in Gujarat. It is located at left bank of Luni river. In this village, there is a  temple of Nag devta which was built by Jorji Darbar the king of Jordiyali village.

Villages in Banaskantha district